Gilan-e Gharb County; Gellan is in Kermanshah province, Iran. The capital of the county is the city of Gilan-e Gharb. At the 2006 census, the county's population was 60,671 in 13,452 households. The following census in 2011 counted 62,858 people in 15,619 households. At the 2016 census, the county's population was 57,007 in 16,570 households. People in Gilan-e Gharb speak Kurdish (Kalhori).

Administrative divisions

The population history of Gilan-e Gharb County's administrative divisions over three consecutive censuses is shown in the following table. The latest census shows two districts, six rural districts, and two cities.

See also
Eslamabad-e Gharb County
Eyvan County
Sarpol-e Zahab County
Qasr-e Shirin County

References

 

Counties of Kermanshah Province